The 1876 South Australian football season was the fourteenth season of interclub football. It was also the final season of decentralised administration of football in South Australia; the South Australian Football Association was formed the following year to provide a committee-based approach to the administration of the sport.

Rules Sets 
During the 1876 football season in South Australia two dominant rule sets were in use.
 Kensington Rules
 Victorian Rules

Major Clubs

Metropolitan 
 Adelaide
 Port Adelaide
 Victorian
 South Adelaide
 Woodville
 Kensington
 Glenelg
 Austral

Outer Metropolitan (Country Clubs) 
 Gawler
 Kapunda
 Willunga

Regional Clubs 
 Mount Gambier
 Young Australian
 Penola
 Naracoorte
 Caltowie
 Yangga
 Laura
 Port Pirie

Educational Institutions 
 St Peter's College
 Prince Alfred College
 Adelaide Educational Institution
 North Adelaide Grammar
 Glenelg Grammar

Metropolitan Football Matches

May 20

May 25

June 3

June 10

June 17

20 June

1 July

July 8

July 15

July 22

July 29

August 5

August 7

August 12

August 19

September 2

Ladder 

In the table below, Senior Results is based only upon games played against senior clubs; the record listed under W-L-D is the record over all matches, including those against country and junior teams.

Exhibition Matches

August 26

References 

1876 in Australian sport
Australian rules football competition seasons
South Australian football season